Keaundre "Dre" Greenlaw (born May 25, 1997) is an American football outside linebacker for the San Francisco 49ers of the National Football League (NFL). He played college football at Arkansas and was drafted by the 49ers in the fifth round of the 2019 NFL Draft.

Early life
Since age eight, Greenlaw grew up in group homes and shelters in Arkansas. Six years later, he met Brian Early, defensive coach for Fayetteville High School. The Early family invited Greenlaw to live with them and formally adopted him at age 21.

High school career
Greenlaw attended Fayetteville Public Schools, playing for a Fayetteville High School football team that won the Class 7A 2011 state championship. He was named to the Arkansas Democrat-Gazette preseason "Super Sophomore" team in 2012. Greenlaw started at cornerback, recording 53 total tackles, two forced fumbles, five pass breakups, and an interception on a team that repeated as 7A state champions. As a junior, he moved to strong safety.

Professional career

Greenlaw was drafted by the San Francisco 49ers in the fifth round (148th overall) of the 2019 NFL Draft. He was drafted after the 49ers traded linebacker Dekoda Watson to acquire the 148th pick.

2019 season: Rookie year
Greenlaw made his NFL debut in the season-opening 31-17 road victory over the Tampa Bay Buccaneers, recording four tackles. During a Week 9 28–25 road victory over the Arizona Cardinals, he recorded four tackles and his first sack on Kyler Murray. In the next game against the Seattle Seahawks on Monday Night Football, Greenlaw recorded eight tackles, a pass deflection, and his first NFL interception off of Russell Wilson in a 27–24 overtime loss. The following week against the Cardinals, Greenlaw recorded 10 tackles as the 49ers won by a score of 36–26.

During a narrow Week 14 48–46 road victory over the New Orleans Saints, Greenlaw recorded seven tackles and a pass deflection. Two weeks later Los Angeles Rams, he recorded a team-high 13 tackles as the 49ers narrowly won by a score of 34–31. In the regular-season finale against the Seahawks on Sunday Night Football, Greenlaw once again recorded a team-high 13 tackles and made a critical stop on tight end Jacob Hollister inside of the one-yard line on the final play of the drive, sealing a 26–21 road victory and securing the first seed for the 49ers in the 2019 playoffs. Greenlaw credited review from the 49ers' Week 15 29–22 loss to the Atlanta Falcons, which ended in a similar scenario where wide receiver Julio Jones was barely able to break the plane into the endzone, for giving him the correct technique to hit Hollister high.

Greenlaw finished his rookie year with 92 tackles, two pass deflections, a sack, and an interception in 16 games and 11 starts. In the Divisional Round of the playoffs against the Minnesota Vikings, Greenlaw recorded four tackles and a forced fumble during the 27–10 win. In the NFC Championship Game against the Green Bay Packers, he recorded six tackles as the 49ers won by a score of 37–20. During Super Bowl LIV against the Kansas City Chiefs, Greenlaw recorded four tackles as the 49ers lost by a score of 31–20.

2020 season
During the season-opening 24–20 loss to the Arizona Cardinals, Greenlaw recorded five tackles and a pass deflection. During a Week 6 24-16 victory over the Los Angeles Rams, he recorded a team-high eight tackles. In the next game against the New England Patriots, Greenlaw recorded six tackles and his first sack of the season on Cam Newton as the 49ers won on the road by a score of 33–6. During a Week 10 27–13 road loss to the New Orleans Saints, Greenlaw recorded a team-high 11 tackles.

Greenlaw finished his second professional season with 86 tackles, a pass deflection, and a sack in 13 games and 11 starts.

2021 season
During the season-opening 41–33 road victory over the Detroit Lions, Greenlaw recorded six tackles and his first defensive touchdown on a pick six off Jared Goff.  Greenlaw was placed on injured reserve on September 18, 2021 after undergoing groin surgery. He was activated on November 27. In the regular-season finale against the Los Angeles Rams, Greenlaw recorded a team-high 12 tackles in the 27–24 overtime road victory.

Greenlaw finished the 2021 season with 21 tackles, a pass deflection, and a pick-six in three games and two starts. The 49ers finished the season with a 10–7 record and earned the #7 seed in the playoffs. In the Wild Card round against the Dallas Cowboys, Greenlaw recorded five tackles in the 23–17 road victory. In the Divisional Round against the Green Bay Packers, he recorded six tackles and a fumble recovery in the narrow 13–10 road victory. During the NFC Championship Game against the Rams, Greenlaw recorded three tackles as the 49ers narrowly lost on the road by a score of 20–17.

2022 season
On September 18, 2022, Greenlaw recorded a team-high eight tackles in a 27-7 victory over the Seattle Seahawks. The next day, he signed a two-year extension with the 49ers.

During a Week 4 24-9 victory over the Los Angeles Rams, Greenlaw recorded a team-high 15 tackles. In the next game against the Carolina Panthers, he recorded a team-high 11 tackles in the 37-15 road victory.

During a Week 10 22-16 victory over the Los Angeles Chargers, Greenlaw recorded a team-high seven tackles before being ejected for a helmet-to-helmet hit on Chargers quarterback Justin Herbert near the end of the second quarter. Greenlaw was later fined $10,609 for the hit. Three weeks later against the Miami Dolphins, he recorded a team-high eight tackles, a pass deflection, and recovered a Tua Tagovailoa fumble forced by Nick Bosa and returned it 23 yards for a touchdown to secure a 33-17 victory for the 49ers. In the next game against the Tampa Bay Buccaneers, Greenlaw recorded a team-high 15 tackles, a pass deflection, and intercepted Tom Brady once in the 35-7 victory. The following week against the Seahawks, Greenlaw recorded eight tackles, two pass deflections, and a forced fumble in the 21-13 road victory.

NFL career statistics

Regular season

Postseason

References

External links
 Man thanks 49ers' Greenlaw for saving daughter

1997 births
Living people
Players of American football from Arkansas
Sportspeople from Fayetteville, Arkansas
American football linebackers
Arkansas Razorbacks football players
San Francisco 49ers players